Moss Bay Cart Siding was used for two periods as a temporary northern terminus for workmen's trains to . It was situated where Moss Bay Road crossed the CWJR's Derwent Branch in southern Workington in the former county of Cumberland, England, which is now part of Cumbria.

No public passenger service ever called at the station.

This service ran along what would become the Lowca Light Railway (LLR).

The second period of use began on 11 July 1915, when two Sundays Only workmen's trains commenced running to meet exceptional wartime need. This service was to run "for the duration." It is not mentioned in the CWJR's July 1920 Working Time Table. This service ran along the LLR.

No photographs have been published of the station or its site.

The track past the siding remained in use to serve Wilkinsons Wagon Works until 1962.

By 2013 no trace of the site remained.

See also
 Gilgarran Branch
 Cleator and Workington Junction Railway

References

Sources

Further reading

External links
 The closed station on an inter-war OS map, via National Library of Scotland
 Latterday steam at Lowca, via flickr
 Latterday steam at Lowca, via flickr
 Industrial relics at Lowca, via flickr
 The line, via railwaycodes
 The Harrington collieries, via Haig Pit Mining Museum

Disused railway stations in Cumbria
Former Cleator and Workington Junction Railway stations
Railway stations in Great Britain opened in 1913
Railway stations in Great Britain closed in 1919
1913 establishments in England